Tasman Fracture Commonwealth Marine Reserve is a 42,502 km2 marine protected area within Australian waters located off the coast of south-west Tasmania. It extends to the southerly limits of the Australian exclusive economic zone in the Indian Ocean and encompasses the Tasman Fracture. The reserve was established in 2007 and is part of the South-east Commonwealth Marine Reserve Network.

The reserve is also habitat to many seabirds, seals and cetaceans, such as dolphins and killer whales. The fauna of this reserve includes subantarctic fishes and seabed invertebrates. Biodiversity within the reserve is influenced by the most easterly extent of the Zeehan Current.

Protection
Most of the Tasman Fracture marine reserve area is IUCN protected area category VI, however there are multiple zoned areas within the reserve with different protection classifications.

See also

 Commonwealth marine reserves
 Protected areas of Australia
 Southern Ocean
 Port Davey - nearby Tasmanian marine reserve within Southwest National Park

Notes

References

External links
 Tasman Fracture Commonwealth Marine Reserve Network website

South-east Commonwealth Marine Reserves Network
Protected areas established in 2007